Charle is a Finnish, French and Swedish masculine given name and nickname that is an alternate form of Charles as well as an English feminine given name and nickname that is a diminutive form of Scarlet and Scarlett.  Notable people referred to by this name include the following:

Given name
Charle Cournoyer (born 1991), Canadian short track speed skater
Charle Young (born 1951), American football player

Nickname/Stagename
Charle stage name of Dr. Velmurugan Thangasamy Manohar (born 1960), Indian male actor

See also

Carle, surnames
Carle (given name)
Charl (name)
Charla (name)
Charlee (name)
Charls

Notes

English feminine given names
Finnish masculine given names
French masculine given names
Swedish masculine given names